Only When I Larf is a 1968 British light-hearted comedy crime drama, directed by Basil Dearden, and starring Richard Attenborough, David Hemmings, and Alexandra Stewart. It is adapted from the 1968 novel Only When I Larf by Len Deighton, and features Attenborough as an ex-brigadier con man in a variety of guises.

Plot summary
In New York City, a trio of confidence tricksters enter a tall office block and go to an empty unit on the 39th floor. They quickly change the identity of the office. Two Americans arrive. Lowther (Attenborough) assumes the role of Mr Stevens, the boss. Bob is ushered in by the secretary and introduced as Mr Glover. They discuss high finance in front of the Americans. They persuade the Americans to write a cheque for $250,000. He writes a cheque for $2 million to them. The cheques are placed in a faux wall safe. Bob goes to other side and takes the smaller cheque out. He re-disguises himself as a security guard. He goes to the bank with Liz and she withdraws the $250,000 as cash.

With the two Americans still in the office Lowther excuses himself for a few minutes but leaves the building. Bob and Liz board a helicopter on a rooftop of the Panam Building near the Chrysler Building. Lowther joins just before it takes off.

A view of the Tower Bridge and the Thames tells us that we are now in London. Lowther discusses his past in the British Army. Lowther is married to Liz and Bob is his son by an earlier marriage.

In Africa with Maurice "Gee Gee* Gray (their next mark) Liz (now called Miss Smallwood) is introduced to Awana, who wants to buy guns. Lowther plots to give him scrap metal instead of guns. Lowther disguises himself as a brigadier and remembers his time at the Battle of El Alamein. Bob dresses as a corporal. They give Awana a demonstration of anti-tank guns.

We next see Awana gagged and in a crate. He is described as incompetent by All Lin, the real leader.

The dynamic of the trio changes when Bob steals a kiss from his step-mother.

Bob meets his friend Spider in the kitchens of the Carlton Hotel. Spider points out Spencer in the restaurant. He then invites Spencer to join his table on the next night. He introduces Lowther as Longbottom, his private secretary, while posing  as Mr Appleyard. They start spending time together: golf, squash, billiards and clay pigeon shooting. He extorts £500,000 out of Spencer, who is led to believe he is getting a 20% commission in a £5 million deal in Lebanon. Lowther dresses as an Arab to try to seal the deal. Bob and Liz plot a two-way split, excluding Lowther.

In the Lebanon Bob and Liz meet Lowther and drive into the wilderness. They are carrying archaeological gear in case they are stopped. Lowther cons a Lebanese banker into letting him use his office to meet Spencer. When Spencer arrives, he has no cash. Spencer phones a Swiss bank to transfer the cash. Lowther collects the cash, but the banker stops him to explain his "only when I laugh" joke from the previous day. Lowther meets Spencer's wife outside and the two join Bob and Liz.

They drive to Umm Al Amad each trying to cheat the other. Ultimately Liz drives off with the cash alone leaving the others laughing.

Cast
 Richard Attenborough as Silas Lowther
 David Hemmings as Bob
 Alexandra Stewart as Liz Mason
 Nicholas Pennell as Spencer
 Melissa Stribling as Diana
 Terence Alexander as Gee Gee Gray
 Edric Connor as Awana
 Clifton Jones as General Sakut
 Calvin Lockhart as Ali Lin
 Brian Grellis as Spider, head waiter at the Carlton
 David Healy as Jones
 Alan Gifford as Poster

Reception
Only When I Larf received mixed reviews, including "a plodding adaptation"; and praise for its "sound, unfussy direction and witty, observed thesping".

References

External links

1968 films
British comedy films
1968 comedy films
1968 crime drama films
Films directed by Basil Dearden
Films about con artists
Films based on British novels
Films scored by Ron Grainer
Films set in London
Films set in New York City
Films set in Lebanon
Films shot in London
Films shot in New York City
Paramount Pictures films
1960s English-language films
1960s British films